Alfie Hewett defeated Shingo Kunieda in the final, 6–3, 7–5 to win the men's singles wheelchair tennis title at the 2018 US Open. It was his first US Open singles title and second major singles title overall.

Stéphane Houdet was the defending champion, but was defeated by Nicolas Peifer in the quarterfinals.

Seeds

Draw

Bracket

External links 

 Draw

Wheelchair Men's Singles
U.S. Open, 2018 Men's Singles